The 1999–2000 United Counties League season was the 93rd in the history of the United Counties League, a football competition in England.

Premier Division

The Premier Division featured 19 clubs which competed in the division last season, along with one new club, promoted from Division One:
Bugbrooke St Michaels

League table

Division One

Division One featured 17 clubs which competed in the division last season, along with one new club:
Deeping Rangers, joined from the Peterborough and District League

League table

References

External links
 United Counties League

1999–2000 in English football leagues
United Counties League seasons